is a private junior college in Osaka, Osaka, Japan, established in 1952. Its primary focus has been training young women for teaching careers, and it has an exchange program with Roberts Wesleyan College in Rochester, New York. It is affiliated with the Free Methodist Church and has a related graduate school of theology for training of pastors.

External links
 Official website

Abeno-ku, Osaka
Educational institutions established in 1952
Private universities and colleges in Japan
Christian universities and colleges in Japan
Christianity in Osaka
Universities and colleges in Osaka
Japanese junior colleges
Seminaries and theological colleges in Japan
1952 establishments in Japan